William Howe (May 12, 1803 – September 9, 1852) was an American architect and bridge builder famous for patenting the Howe truss design for bridges in 1840.

Life and career
William Howe was born on May 12, 1803, in Spencer, Massachusetts, to Elijah and Fanny ( Bemis) Howe. His father owned a sawmill, He was a hard-working child, and learned carpentry and construction at an early age. After successfully completing an apprenticeship in carpentry, he enrolled and graduated from Leicester Academy in Leicester, Massachusetts.

Howe married Azubah Stone, daughter of a Charlton, Massachusetts, farmer (and sister of Amasa Stone) in 1828. The Howe family was an inventive one. Howe's nephew, Elias Howe, patented the first viable sewing machine. Howe's older brother, Tyler Howe, invented the box spring bed. William Howe established a career as a construction contractor, building homes and churches. He was particularly well-known for his churches. But bridges were his primary interest, and he founded the Howe Bridge Works in 1840.

In 1840, Howe was engaged to build a railroad bridge over the Connecticut River in Springfield, Massachusetts. This famous bridge was of a new, influential design—the Howe truss bridge, which Howe patented in 1840. One of Howe's workmen, Amasa Stone, purchased for $40,000 ($ in  dollars) in 1842 the rights to Howe's patented bridge design. (Amasa Stone received financial backing from Azariah Boody, a Springfield businessman.) The rights to the patent extended to bridges and structures erected only in New England. That same year, the two men formed a bridge-building firm, Boody, Stone & Co., which erected a large number of Howe truss bridges throughout New England.

Howe made additional improvements, and patented a second Howe truss design in 1846.

William Howe suffered a severe carriage accident and died on September 19, 1852. He was buried in Springfield.

References

Bibliography

1803 births
1852 deaths
People from Spencer, Massachusetts
Engineers from Massachusetts
 William Howe
19th-century American architects